Kashentsev is a Russian male surname; its feminine counterpart is Kashentseva. Notable people with the name include:
Nikolai Kashentsev (born 1974), Russian association football player
Yevgeni Kashentsev (born 1971), Belarusian association football player

Russian-language surnames